André Berley (13 January 1890 – 26 November 1936) was a French actor.

Berley was born André Edmond Obrecht in the 6th arrondissement of Paris.

Selected filmography

 The Passion of Joan of Arc (1928)
 Olimpia (1930)
 The Playboy of Paris (1930)
 The Big House (1930)
 A Lady Morals (1930)
 Une audition mouvementée (1931)
 Parlor, Bedroom and Bath (1931)
 Der kleine Seitensprung (1931)
 The Bachelor Father (1931)
 The Little Cafe (1931) - Pierre Bourdin
 Jenny Lind (1932)
 La Perle (1932)
 Coquin de sort (1932)
 You Will Be a Duchess (1932)
 Prisonnier de mon cœur (1932)
 Avec l'assurance (1932)
 Billeting Order (1932)
 Boubouroche (1933)
  (1933)
 Le Martyre de l'obèse (1933)
 La Prison de Saint-Clothaire (1933)
 Caravan (1934)
 The Typist Gets Married (1934)
 Son excellence Antonin (1935)
 Juanita (1935)
 Les mutinés de l'Elseneur (1936)
 Bout de chou (1935)
 Le Grand Pari (1935)
 Folies-Bergère de Paris (1935)
 Trois jours de perm' (1936)
 Toi c'est moi (1936) - Pedro Hernandez
 Monsieur Personne (1936)
 L'Emprenite rouge (1937)
 The House Opposite (1937)
 À minuit, le 7 (1937)
 La Course à la vertu (1937)

References

External links

1890 births
1936 deaths
French male film actors
French male silent film actors
Male actors from Paris
20th-century French male actors